Prince Pyotr Nikolayevich Gruzinsky (literally "Peter of Georgia"; 1837–1892) was a Georgian royal prince (batonishvili) from the House of Mukhrani of the royal Bagrationi dynasty. Pyotr painted landscapes and genre paintings, and was also known for his paintings of battle scenes from the Caucasus War.

He was the son of Prince Nikoloz Gruzinsky and a scion of the Mukhrani-Gruzinsky branch of the Bagrationi dynasty that had moved to Imperial Russia in the 18th century. Pyotr Nikolayevich Gruzinsky was the last direct male descendant of King Vakhtang VI of Kartli and the last in the Gruzinsky line.

Paintings

References 

1837 births
1892 deaths
House of Mukhrani
19th-century painters from the Russian Empire
Russian male painters
Russian people of Georgian descent
Imperial Academy of Arts alumni
Awarded with a large gold medal of the Academy of Arts
Members of the Imperial Academy of Arts